Pleocoma crinita is a species of rain beetle in the family Pleocomidae. It is found in North America.

References

Further reading

 

scarabaeiformia
Articles created by Qbugbot
Beetles described in 1938
Taxa named by Earle Gorton Linsley